CTU may refer to:

Schools
 Can Tho University, Vietnam
 Capitol Technology University, Maryland
 Catholic Theological Union, Illinois
 Cebu Technological University, Philippines
 Chienkuo Technology University, Taiwan
 Chilean Traditional Universities
 Chunnam Techno University, South Korea
 Colorado Technical University
 Czech Technical University in Prague

Organizations
 Chicago Teachers Union, a labor union
 Conservative Trade Unionists, UK
 New Zealand Council of Trade Unions
 CHH Txuri Urdin, a Spanish ice hockey team
 Corporate Training Unlimited, a security contracting firm operating in Iraq

Other
 Chandigarh Transport Undertaking, India
 Chengdu Shuangliu International Airport (IATA airport code), China
 Clinical trials unit
 Coding tree unit, the basic processing unit of the High Efficiency Video Coding (HEVC) video standard
 Counter Terrorism Unit, a fictional government agency from the television series 24